Jeff Mason (born August 11, 1981) is an American former professional ice hockey defenseman and coach. He is currently the General Manager and Head Coach of the Dundee Stars in the Elite Ice Hockey League (EIHL).

Career
Mason played college hockey at Providence College in Hockey East. In his senior season Mason earned three awards at the teams annual awards banquet. Mason, who was captain of the 2004-05 team, earned the Ron Wilson Best Defensive Player Award, the Friar Award and Plus/Minus Award. He led the team with a plus/minus rating of +9, marking the second time in his four years at Providence that he was first on the squad in that category. Mason also earned the award in his freshman season as well as receiving the Reverend Herman Schneider Award, which is given to the most valuable freshman.

After four years at Providence College, Mason attended NHL training camp with the Pittsburgh Penguins. He then began his professional hockey career with Hermes in the Finnish second division before returning to North America and signing with the ECHL's Augusta Lynx in 2005.  The next season, he signed with the Long Beach Ice Dogs and was the team's highest scoring defenseman, scoring 11 goals and 31 assists for 42 points in what was a difficult season for the Ice Dogs as they finished bottom of the Pacific Division.  Mason then spent the next two seasons playing for the Gwinnett Gladiators. In his second season in 2008-09, Mason scored 14 goals and 22 assists for 36 points and was the team's top scoring defenseman. His 14 goals ranked second amongst ECHL defenseman.

In 2009-10, Mason split the season with the Kalamazoo Wings and in the German 2nd Bundesliga for the Heilbronner Falken. In 2010, Mason signed with the Belfast Giants of the United Kingdom's Elite Ice Hockey League. In 2011-12 Mason led the EIHL in Defenseman scoring with 19 goals and 41 assists for 60 points. Mason earned a First Team All-Star selection as well as being named the MVP Defenseman for the EIHL. The Giants won the Elite League title in 2011-12.

Mason joined Lillehammer IK in the Norwegian GET-ligaen for the 2012–13, but played just ten games before returning to the Giants for the remainder of the season and won the EIHL Championship for the second time with the Giants in 2013-14. In 2014-15 Mason tied for the team goal scoring lead amongst defenseman with 7 and was also voted the team's Best Defenseman. He remained with the Giants until his retirement after the 2017-18 season, during which the Giants won the Challenge Cup.

Mason ranks first all time in points by a Giants Defenceman and 6th overall for points scored in Giants history.

Coaching career

In August 2019, Mason was appointed an assistant coach with his former club Belfast Giants, joining the staff of head coach Adam Keefe at the EIHL side.

In May 2022, Mason was announced as the Head Coach and General Manager of the Dundee Stars, replacing Omar Pacha.

Career statistics

Awards and honors

References

External links
 
 
 Jeff Mason's profile and statistics from the Belfast Giants

1981 births
American men's ice hockey defensemen
American ice hockey coaches
Augusta Lynx players
Belfast Giants players
Gwinnett Gladiators players
Living people
Long Beach Ice Dogs (ECHL) players
Providence Friars men's ice hockey players
Ice hockey coaches from Massachusetts
Ice hockey players from Massachusetts
American expatriate ice hockey players in Finland
American expatriate ice hockey players in Germany
American expatriate ice hockey players in Northern Ireland
American expatriate ice hockey players in Norway